Paul E. Sicula (January 31, 1939 – March 17, 2017) was an American lawyer and politician.

Biography
Sicula was born on January 31, 1939, in Milwaukee, Wisconsin. After graduating from Washington High School, Sicula graduated from the University of Wisconsin-Madison in 1962 and then received his law degree from the University of Wisconsin Law School. He then practiced law. During the Vietnam War, he served in the United States Army Reserve. Sicula died on March 17, 2017.

Political career
Sicula was first elected to the Wisconsin State Assembly in 1966 and served from 1967 to 1977. He was a Democrat.

References

External links

Politicians from Milwaukee
Democratic Party members of the Wisconsin State Assembly
Military personnel from Wisconsin
United States Army soldiers
University of Wisconsin–Madison alumni
University of Wisconsin Law School alumni
Wisconsin lawyers
1939 births
2017 deaths
20th-century American lawyers